Grigore Sichitiu (born 3 January 1949) is a Romanian professional football manager. He also held several positions as technical director or club president at various clubs such as Rapid Bucharest, Sportul Studențesc, Ceahlăul Piatra Neamț, Politehnica Iași and Fortuna Poiana Câmpina.

Honours

Manager
Extensiv Craiova
Divizia B: 1998–99

Baniyas
UAE First Division League: 2004–05

Dhofar
Oman Professional League Cup runner-up: 2014–15

References

External links
 

1949 births
Living people
Romanian football managers
Romanian expatriate football managers
FCM Bacău managers
Baniyas SC managers
Al-Taawoun FC managers
Dhofar Club managers
Saudi Professional League managers
Romanian expatriate sportspeople in Saudi Arabia
Expatriate football managers in the United Arab Emirates
Expatriate football managers in Saudi Arabia
Expatriate football managers in Kuwait
Expatriate football managers in Oman
Romanian sports executives and administrators
Al Jahra SC managers
Kuwait Premier League managers
Romanian expatriate sportspeople in Kuwait
Romanian expatriate sportspeople in Oman
Romanian expatriate sportspeople in the United Arab Emirates
Oman Professional League managers
UAE Pro League managers
FC Rapid București presidents